Professor Pyarelal is a 1981 Hindi film produced by T.M. Bihari, directed by Brij Sadanah, featuring Dharmendra, Zeenat Aman, Simi Garewal, Shreeram Lagoo, Amjad Khan and Nirupa Roy in the lead roles. Kalyanji-Anandji have composed the music, while Rajendra Krishan has written the lyrics for the film. Hrishikesh Mukherjee has done the editing for the film.

Some of the scenes were filmed in the United Kingdom, notably in the West London area of Uxbridge and Hillingdon, Middlesex.

The film became popular as it was seen to carry forward the legacy of the Manmohan Desai genre of films. Among the movie's songs, the title song became very popular at the time.

Cast
 Dharmendra as Ram Shinde / Professor Pyarelal
 Zeenat Aman as Sonia B. Singh / Asha Rai
 Simi Garewal as Rita
 Shriram Lagoo as Kishanchand / King
 Amjad Khan as Ronnie / Ranjit Singh / Gomes
 Jeevan as Shyamlal / Sammy
 Vinod Mehra as Professor Pyarelal
 Satyen Kappu as Police Commissioner Albert D'Souza
 Shammi Kapoor Mr. Rai

Soundtrack
The music of the film was composed by Kalyanji-Anandji and Lyrics by Rajendra Krishan.

Film Inconsistencies
The Police Car used in the chase scene with Vinod Mehra was a Ford Cortina mk 3. When Vinod Mehra is wounded by Police, the actual car that overturned within the shot was a Hindustan Ambassador.

References

External links

1981 films
1980s Hindi-language films
Films scored by Kalyanji Anandji
Films directed by Brij Sadanah